Anton Novik (born 23 July 1998) is a Belarusian professional footballer who plays for Viktoriya Maryina Gorka.

References

External links 
 
 
 Profile at FC Minsk website

1998 births
Living people
Belarusian footballers
Association football midfielders
FC Minsk players
FC UAS Zhitkovichi players
FC Naftan Novopolotsk players
FC Belshina Bobruisk players
FC Smorgon players
FC Viktoryja Marjina Horka players